Aphelia viburnana, the bilberry tortrix, is a moth of the family Tortricidae. It is found in Europe, from Portugal and Great Britain to the Ural Mountains, Siberia and Mongolia, further east to the Russian Far East (Primorsk and the Kuril Islands).

The length of the forewings is about 11 mm. The forewings are narrowed anteriorly and ochreous-brownish, sometimes faintly strigulated with ferruginous. The central fascia and costal patch are sometimes obscurely darker. The hindwings are grey. The larva is pale olive -green or green - blackish ; spots white; head and plate of 2 pale brown, black-marked Julius von Kennel provides a full description. 

The moth flies from June to September in western Europe.

The larvae feed on Vaccinium and Ericaceae, but also Salix species.

References

External links
 Lepidoptera of Belgium
 Taxonomy on Fauna Europaea
 Bilberry Tortrix at UK Moths

Aphelia (moth)
Moths of Asia
Tortricidae of Europe
Moths described in 1775